Lieutenant General Gerald Littlehales Goodlake VC (14 May 1832 – 5 April 1890) was an English recipient of the Victoria Cross, the highest and most prestigious award for gallantry in the face of the enemy that can be awarded to British and Commonwealth forces.

Early life
Gerald Goodlake was the son of Thomas Mills Goodlake of Wadley at Faringdon in Berkshire (now Oxfordshire) and his wife, Emilia Maria, the daughter of Sir Edward Baker, 1st Baronet of Radstone in Dorset. He was commissioned into the 21st Regiment of Foot on 14 June 1850. He exchanged (by purchase) into the Coldstream Guards on 27 June 1851. He served in the Crimea with the 1st Battalion and took part in the battles of Alma, Inkerman, Balaclava and Sevastopol.

Victoria Cross
Goodlake was 22 years old, and a brevet major in the Coldstream Guards, British Army during the Crimean War when the following deed took place for which he was awarded the VC.

On 28 October 1854 at Inkerman, Crimea, Major Goodlake was in command of a party of sharpshooters which held Windmill Ravine against a much larger force of the enemy, killing 38 (including an officer) and taking three prisoners. He also showed conspicuous gallantry on a later occasion when his sharpshooters surprised a picquet and seized the knapsacks and rifles of the enemy.

He later achieved the rank of lieutenant general.

His Victoria Cross is displayed at The Guards Regimental Headquarters (Grenadier Guards RHQ) in Wellington Barracks, London, England.

References

Location of grave and VC medal (Middlesex)

British recipients of the Victoria Cross
Crimean War recipients of the Victoria Cross
British Army personnel of the Crimean War
British Army lieutenant generals
Royal Scots Fusiliers officers
Coldstream Guards officers
People from Faringdon
1832 births
1890 deaths
Chevaliers of the Légion d'honneur
Recipients of the Order of the Medjidie
British Army recipients of the Victoria Cross